Viscount  was a Japanese statesman in Meiji period Japan.

Biography

Kōno was born in Kōchi, Tosa Province (present-day Kōchi Prefecture) as the eldest son of a local low-ranking samurai. He was sent to Edo in 1858 where (along with Mutsu Munemitsu) he studied under the noted Confucian scholar, Yasui Sokken. On his return to Tosa in 1861, he joined the  movement organized by Takechi Hanpeita and Sakamoto Ryōma and became active in the Sonnō jōi movement. In 1862, along with 59 other Tosa samurai, he marched on Kyoto and Edo in an attempt to influence national policy, but was captured by security forces of the Tokugawa shogunate in 1863 and sentenced to six years in prison. Tortured while in prison, he refused to recant and his sentence was extended to life imprisonment.

After the Meiji Restoration, Kōno was freed and was recruited by fellow Tosa countryman Gotō Shōjirō to assist Etō Shimpei in the administration of Osaka. With the establishment of the Samurai Administration Bureau, he was sent to Hiroshima in 1874. However, with increasing ex-samurai discontent erupted into open rebellion in various locations, he was assigned to assist Ōkubo Toshimichi in restoration of central government authority in Kyūshū. In this capacity, he faced his former mentor Etō Shimpei in the Saga Rebellion. He treated Etō very roughly during his trial, refusing him a chance to defend his actions in court, and pushing for an early death verdict.

Kōno was appointed to the Genrōin in 1875, becoming its vice-chairman in 1878. In 1880, he was appointed Education Lord under the initial Daijō-kan system of the Meiji government, and became Agriculture and Commerce Lord under the same system in 1881. Politically, he allied himself with Ōkuma Shigenobu, joining his Rikken Kaishintō political party as its vice-chairman. In 1888, he was appointed to the Privy Council.

In 1892, Kōno joined the first Matsukata Masayoshi cabinet with overlapping portfolios the Minister of Agriculture & Commerce, Home Minister, Minister of Justice and Minister of Education. He continued to hold the post of Minister of Education under the Second Itō Hirobumi administration.

In 1893, Kōno was ennobled with the rank of shishaku (viscount) in the kazoku peerage system. He died in 1895, and his grave is at Aoyama Cemetery in Tokyo.

References

Notes

1844 births
1895 deaths
People from Kōchi Prefecture
People from Tosa Domain
Kazoku
People of Meiji-period Japan
Government ministers of Japan
Rikken Kaishintō politicians
19th-century Japanese politicians
Ministers of Home Affairs of Japan